Alfred Norval Mitchell, OBE, was born 18 December 1906. He served in India from 1930 to 1947, initially with the Indian Civil Service and transferring to the Indian Political Service in 1934. He was appointed an Officer of the Order of the British Empire in the London Gazette 2 June 1943 as Political Agent, Orissa States Agency. 

His final position was Chief Secretary of the North-West Frontier Province under the Governor, Sir Olaf Caroe. His later career included Clerk to the Legislative Council of Northern Rhodesia and Secretary and Registrar of the University of St Andrews.

In 1968 he completed a biography of Sir George Cunningham, Governor of the Northwest Frontier Province of India 1937-46 and again 1947–48, which was published by William Blackwood, Edinburgh. In 1975 he completed an autobiography covering his early life and his service in India. This was edited and published posthumously in 2006 by his son, David Norval Mitchell, under the title The Quiet People of India.

He died in 1988.

Indian Civil Service (British India) officers
Indian Political Service officers
People associated with the University of St Andrews
Officers of the Order of the British Empire
1906 births
1988 deaths
British people in colonial India